In chemistry, a charge-transfer (CT) complex or electron-donor-acceptor complex describes a type of supramolecular assembly of two or more molecules or ions.  The assembly consists of two molecules that self-attract through electrostatic forces, i.e., one has at least partial negative charge and the partner has partial positive charge, referred to respectively as the electron acceptor and electron donor.  In some cases, the degree of charge transfer is "complete", such that the CT complex can be classified as a salt.  In other cases, the charge-transfer association is weak, and the interaction can be disrupted easily by polar solvents.

Examples

Electron donor-acceptor complexes 
A number of organic compounds form charge-transfer complex, which are often described as electron-donor-acceptor complexes (EDA complexes).  Typical acceptors are nitrobenzenes or tetracyanoethylene.  The strength of their interaction with electron donors correlates with the ionization potentials of the components.  For TCNE, the stability constants (L/mol) for its complexes with benzene derivatives correlates with the number of methyl groups: benzene (0.128), 1,3,5-trimethylbenzene (1.11), 1,2,4,5-tetramethylbenzene (3.4), and hexamethylbenzene (16.8).

1,3,5-Trinitrobenzene and related polynitrated aromatic compounds, being electron-deficient, form charge-transfer complexes with many arenes.  Such complexes form upon crystallization, but often dissociate in solution to the components.  Characteristically, these CT salts crystallize in stacks of alternating donor and acceptor (nitro aromatic) molecules, i.e. A-B-A-B.

Dihalogen/interhalogen CT complexes
Dihalogens X2 (X = Cl, Br, I) and interhalogens XY(X = I; Y = Cl, Br) are Lewis acid species capable of forming a variety of products when reacted with donor species. Among these species (including oxidation or protonated products), CT adducts D·XY have been largely investigated. The CT interaction has been quantified and is the basis of many schemes for parameterizing donor and acceptor properties, such as those devised by Gutmann, Childs, Beckett, and the ECW model.

Many organic species featuring chalcogen or pnicogen donor atoms form CT salts. The nature of the resulting adducts can be investigated both in solution and in the solid state.  

In solution, the intensity of charge-transfer bands in the UV-Vis absorbance spectrum is strongly dependent upon the degree (equilibrium constant) of this association reaction. Methods have been developed to determine the equilibrium constant for these complexes in solution by measuring the intensity of absorption bands as a function of the concentration of donor and acceptor components in solution. The Benesi-Hildebrand method, named for its developers, was first described for the association of iodine dissolved in aromatic hydrocarbons. 

In the solid state a valuable parameter is the elongation of the X–X or X–Y bond length, resulting from the antibonding nature of the σ* LUMO. The elongation can be evaluated by means of structural determinations (XRD) and FT-Raman spectroscopy.

A well-known example is the complex formed by iodine when combined with starch, which exhibits an intense purple charge-transfer band.  This has widespread use as a rough screen for counterfeit currency. Unlike most paper, the paper used in US currency is not sized with starch. Thus, formation of this purple color on application of an iodine solution indicates a counterfeit.

TTF-TCNQ: prototype for electrically conducting complexes

In 1954, charge-transfer salts derived from perylene with iodine or bromine were reported with resistivities as low as 8 ohm·cm. In 1973, it was discovered that a combination tetracyanoquinodimethane (TCNQ) and tetrathiafulvalene (TTF) form a strong charge-transfer complex, referred to as TTF-TCNQ. The solid shows almost metallic electrical conductance and was the first discovered purely organic conductor. In a TTF-TCNQ crystal, TTF and TCNQ molecules are arranged independently in separate parallel-aligned stacks, and an electron transfer occurs from donor (TTF) to acceptor (TCNQ) stacks. Hence, electrons and electron holes are separated and concentrated in the stacks and can traverse in a one-dimensional direction along the TCNQ and TTF columns, respectively, when an electric potential is applied to the ends of a crystal in the stack direction.

Superconductivity is exhibited by tetramethyl-tetraselenafulvalene-hexafluorophosphate (TMTSF2PF6), which is a semi-conductor at ambient conditions, shows superconductivity at low temperature (critical temperature) and high pressure: 0.9 K and 12 kbar. Critical current densities in these complexes are very small.

Mechanistic implications
Many reactions involving nucleophiles attacking electrophiles can be usefully assessed from the perspective of an incipient charge-transfer complex.  Examples include electrophilic aromatic substitution, the addition of Grignard reagents to ketones, and brominolysis of metal-alkyl bonds.

See also
 Organic semiconductor
 Organic superconductor
 Exciplex - a special case where one of the molecules is in an excited state

Historical sources
 Y. Okamoto and W. Brenner Organic Semiconductors, Rheinhold (1964)

References

Physical organic chemistry
Molecular electronics
Organic semiconductors